Breña District is the smallest district of the Lima Province in Peru. It is part of Lima city metropolitan area.

Government and politics

The current mayor is José Dalton Li Bravo.

Geography
The district has a total land area of 3.22 km2. Its administrative center is located 102 meters above sea level.

Boundaries

 North, East and West: Lima District
 Southeast: Jesús María District
 Southwest: Pueblo Libre District

Festivities 
 May 24: Mary Help of Christians
 November: Lord of Miracles

See also 
 Administrative divisions of Peru

References

External links
 
 Municipality of Breña 

Districts of Lima
1949 establishments in Peru